Hendrik Brocks (27 March 1942 – 8 March 2023) was an Indonesian cyclist. He competed in the individual road race and team time trial events at the 1960 Summer Olympics.

Brocks died in Sukabumi, Jawa Barat on 8 March 2023, at the age of 80.

References 

1942 births
2023 deaths
Javanese people
Dutch male cyclists
Dutch people of Indonesian descent
Cyclists at the 1960 Summer Olympics
Indonesian male cyclists
Olympic cyclists of Indonesia
Asian Games medalists in cycling
Cyclists at the 1962 Asian Games
Medalists at the 1962 Asian Games
Asian Games gold medalists for Indonesia
People from Sukabumi
Sportspeople from West Java
20th-century Indonesian people